This is a list of sulfonamides used in medicine.

Antimicrobials 

 Short-acting
 Sulfacetamide
 Sulfadiazine
 Sulfadimidine
 Sulfafurazole (sulfisoxazole)
 Sulfisomidine (sulfaisodimidine)

 Intermediate-acting
 Sulfamethoxazole
 Sulfamoxole
 Sulfanitran

 Long-acting
 Sulfadimethoxine
 Sulfamethoxypyridazine
 Sulfametoxydiazine

 Ultra long-acting
 Sulfadoxine
 Sulfametopyrazine
 Terephtyl

Sulfonylureas (anti-diabetic agents) 

 Acetohexamide
 Carbutamide
 Chlorpropamide
 Glibenclamide (glyburide)
 Glibornuride
 Gliclazide
 Glyclopyramide
 Glimepiride
 Glipizide
 Gliquidone
 Glisoxepide
 Tolazamide
 Tolbutamide

Diuretics 

 Acetazolamide
 Bumetanide
 Chlorthalidone
 Clopamide
 Furosemide
 Hydrochlorothiazide
 Indapamide
 Mefruside
 Metolazone
 Xipamide
 Methazolamide

Anticonvulsants 

 Ethoxzolamide
 Sultiame
 Zonisamide

Dermatologicals 

 Mafenide

Antiretrovirals 

 Amprenavir (HIV protease inhibitor)
 Darunavir (HIV protease inhibitor)
 Delavirdine (non-nucleoside reverse transcriptase inhibitor)
 Fosamprenavir (HIV protease inhibitor)
 Tipranavir (HIV protease inhibitor)

Hepatitis C antivirals 

 Asunaprevir (NS3/4A protease inhibitor)
 Beclabuvir (NS5B RNA polymerase inhibitor)
 Dasabuvir (NS5B RNA polymerase inhibitor)
 Grazoprevir (NS3/4A protease inhibitor)
 Paritaprevir (NS3/4A protease inhibitor)
 Simeprevir (NS3/4A protease inhibitor)

Stimulants 

 Azabon

NSAIDs 

 Apricoxib (COX-2 inhibitor)
 Celecoxib (COX-2 inhibitor)
 Parecoxib (COX-2 inhibitor)

Cardiac and Vasoactive Medications 

 Bosentan (endothelin receptor antagonist)
 Dofetilide (class III antiarrhythmic)
 Dronedarone (class III antiarrhythmic)
 Ibutilide (class III antiarrhythmic)
 Sotalol (β blocker)
 Tamsulosin (α blocker)
 Udenafil (PDE5 inhibitor)

Others 

 Brinzolamide (carbonic anhydrase inhibitor for glaucoma)
 Dorzolamide (anti-glaucoma carbonic anhydrase inhibitor)
 Probenecid (uricosuric)
 Sulfasalazine (anti-inflammatory agent and a DMARD)
 Sumatriptan (antimigraine triptan)

References

External links 

 List of sulfonamides
 Author of The Demon Under the Microscope, a history of the discovery of the sulfa drugs
 A History of the Fight Against Tuberculosis in Canada (Chemotherapy)
 Presentation speech, Nobel Prize in Physiology and Medicine, 1939
 The History of WW II Medicine
 "Five Medical Miracles of the Sulfa Drugs". Popular Science, June 1942, pp. 73–78.
 A history of antibiotics

Disulfiram-like drugs
Hepatotoxins

Sulfonamides